The Journal of Steroid Biochemistry and Molecular Biology is a peer-reviewed scientific journal, covering all aspects of steroid metabolism. It was established in the 1969 as Journal of Steroid Biochemistry and obtained its current name in 1990. The editor-in-chief is Jerzy Adamski (Helmholtz Zentrum München). According to the Journal Citation Reports, the journal has a 2021 impact factor of 5.011.

Abstracting and indexing 
The journal is abstracted and indexed in:

References

External links 
 

Publications established in 1969
Biochemistry journals
Molecular and cellular biology journals
Elsevier academic journals
English-language journals